Matthew Crosby (born 12 February 1980) is an English comedian and writer.

Early life 
Matthew Crosby was born in Bromley. He attended St Olave's Grammar School., and went on to study English and American Literature with Film Studies at the University of Kent at Canterbury, where he met Tom Parry and Brendan Dodds.

Biography 
Crosby was originally a teacher but left the profession to try comedy in 2004. He has since performed stand-up and sketch comedy all over the world, and was a semi-finalist for the BBC New Act 2005. He comperes at several comedy venues including the Horsebridge Comedy Club in Whitstable. Crosby is a founding member of sketch team Pappy's, formerly known as Pappy's Fun Club.

In August 2006 Crosby performed at the Edinburgh Festival Fringe in two shows: the Comedy Bucket, a stand-up showcase, and Pappy's Fun Club. In August 2007 the Edinburgh run of Pappy's Fun Club was nominated for an if.comedy award, formerly known as the Perrier award.
Crosby is a keen archer and was employed to fire the arrows in the remake of the Strongbow Cider advert.
Crosby performed stand-up as part of the Leicester Comedy Festival in 2007 and 2008. He also performed during the Melbourne International Comedy Festival in 2008.

As part of Pappy's Fun Club, Crosby returned to the Edinburgh Fringe with Funergy in 2008, World Record Attempt: 200 Sketches in an Hour in 2009, All Business in 2010, and Last Show Ever in 2012. Each show was followed by a tour of the UK.

Crosby was a regular contributor to comedy podcast Answer Me This!, playing various characters in jingles and sketches.

Crosby took his debut solo stand-up show, Adventure Party, to the Edinburgh Festival Fringe in 2011, where it received a number of 4* reviews.

Crosby is co-creator of the BBC Three sitcom Badults which ran for two series.

In 2015 Crosby took another solo hour show to Edinburgh called Smaller Than Life. The show notably included a semi-naked impression of Vladimir Putin. He co-devised and co-wrote the comedy panel show Hypothetical for UK TV channel Dave.

In June 2019, Crosby launched a new Sunday morning show on Radio X with fellow comedian, Ed Gamble, produced by Vinay Joshi. The pair quickly became affectionately known as Crunch and Crumble.

Crosby currently lives in Beckenham, south-east London with his wife and two children.

Television appearances 
Weekend At Alan's (1989)
Meet the Parents – Channel 4 (2010)
Trinny and Susannah – From Boom to Bust – Channel 4 (2010)
Girl Friday – Channel 4
TNT Show – Channel 4
Ed and Oucho Transmission Impossible – BBC Two
Winging It – BBC Two
Comedy Cuts Series 3: Pappy's Fun Club Tough Gig – ITV2
Comedy Lab: Pappy's Fun Club – Channel 4
The Culture Show – BBC Two
Ed and Oucho – CBBC
Comedy Cuts – ITV 2
Comedy Shuffle – BBC Three
Malcolm in Space – BBC Two
8 Out of 10 Cats – Channel 4 (3 August 2011)
Never Mind the Buzzcocks – BBC Two (21 November 2011)
Hi Pals, I'm Up Next! – BBC One
Animal Antics – BBC One
Badults – BBC Three (2013)
Great Movie Mistakes – BBC Three (December 2013)
8 Out of 10 Cats Does Countdown – Channel 4 (18 July 2014)
Alan Davies: As Yet Untitled – Dave (February 2015)
The Dog Ate My Homework – CBBC (2015–present)
8 Out of 10 Cats Does Countdown – Channel 4 (17 February 2017)
Uncle – BBC Three (January 2017)
Ready or Not - BBC One (March–April 2018)

Radio appearances 
Matt Forde Show – TalkSport
Jon Richardson Show – BBC 6 Music
MusicHappy Monday's – Pappy's Fun Club – BBC Radio 1
Transatlantic with Andy Zaltzman – BBC Radio 4
Switch with Annie Mac – BBC Radio 1
Weekender – BBC Radio 2
The Sitcom Club – BOGGENSTROVIA PODCAST
28 Acts in 28 Minutes – BBC Radio 4
Josh Widdicombe Show – XFM
So Wrong It's Right – BBC Radio 4

Writing 
The King Is Dead – BBC3
World Wide Robert (Pilot) – Channel 4
Dirty Sexy Funny (Series 2) – Comedy Central
Five Hundred Rooms Of Cod - ITV4
Ask Rhod Gilbert – BBC2
The Big Ship – co-written with Stefan Golaszewski
The Kevin Bishop Show (Series 1 and 2) – Channel 4
TNT Show – Channel 4
Rastamouse – CBeebies
The Now Show – BBC Radio 4
Hypothetical - Dave
The Last Leg - Channel 4
The Great British Bake Off - Channel 4

References

External links 
 
 Matthew Crosby comedy CV
 Pappy's official website

English male comedians
English stand-up comedians
Living people
1980 births
People from Bromley
Alumni of the University of Kent
People educated at St Olave's Grammar School
21st-century English comedians